Antoine "Spitz" Kohn (1 November 1933 – 24 November 2012) was a Luxembourg football player and football manager.

Club career
Kohn played as a striker, and spent most of his career plying his trade abroad, in Germany, Switzerland, and finally Netherlands, where he later became a successful manager.  During his playing days, he earned the nickname "Spitz" for his ferocity and goal-scoring instinct.

International career
Kohn made his debut for Luxembourg in a September 1953 World Cup qualification match against France, in which he immediately scored a goal. He went on to earn 7 caps, scoring one goal, all of them in FIFA World Cup qualification matches. He won a total of 16 caps (6 goals) including unofficial matches.

He played his final international game in September 1965, a 2–5 defeat by Yugoslavia.

International goals
Scores and results list Luxembourg's goal tally first.

Manager career
After retiring as a player, Kohn became manager at FC Twente in July 1972 and clinched runner-up spot in the 1973–74 season, in the 1972–73 season FC Twente finished 3rd in the Dutch competition, in the 1974–75, 1975–76 and 1977–78 seasons, FC Twente finished as 4th club in the Dutch competition. In May 1975 they reached the UEFA Cup Final, losing 1–5 on aggregate to German side Borussia Mönchengladbach. The Dutch Cup was won in the 1976–77 season (FC Twente-PEC Zwolle 3–0), in the 1978–79 season the Cup final was lost (Ajax-FC Twente 1-1, 3–0).

Kohn moved on to Go Ahead Eagles in 1980 and Club Brugge in 1981 before rejoining Twente in the 1982/1983 season, but he could not save them from relegation that year. Between June 1984 and June 1990 he was assistant-coach at Ajax Amsterdam. After the firing of coach Aad de Mos, Kohn was the responsible manager, the last 5 rounds of the 1984/1985-season, coaching Ajax to the Dutch championship, with players like Hans Galjé, Stanley Menzo, Sonny Silooy, Frank Rijkaard, Ronald Koeman, Gerald Vanenburg, Marco van Basten, Rob de Wit, John van 't Schip and John Bosman. After 5 rounds in the 1988/1989 season Kohn became the responsible manager at Ajax, his assistant being Louis van Gaal.

He finished his career as a scout for Udinese and SC Heerenveen.

Honours (as a player)
Luxembourg National Division: 2
 1951, 1954

Luxembourg Cup: 1
 1954

German Cup: 2
 1955, 1956

References

External links
 Player profile – FC Twente
 Manager profile – FC Twente
 Bio – Twentesport 
 Bio – Club Brugge 
 
 Dutch league stats – Voetbal International
 Bio – Profootball 

1933 births
2012 deaths
Sportspeople from Luxembourg City
Luxembourgian footballers
Luxembourgian expatriate footballers
Luxembourgian football managers
Luxembourgian expatriate football managers
Jeunesse Esch players
Karlsruher SC players
FC Basel players
Fortuna Sittard players
Sportclub Enschede players
FC Twente players
Eredivisie players
FC Twente managers
Go Ahead Eagles managers
Club Brugge KV head coaches
AFC Ajax managers
Eredivisie managers
Expatriate footballers in West Germany
Luxembourgian expatriate sportspeople in West Germany
Expatriate footballers in Switzerland
Luxembourgian expatriate sportspeople in Switzerland
Expatriate footballers in the Netherlands
Luxembourgian expatriate sportspeople in the Netherlands
Luxembourgian expatriate sportspeople in Belgium
Expatriate football managers in the Netherlands
Expatriate football managers in Belgium
Association football forwards
Luxembourg international footballers
AFC Ajax non-playing staff